MF  Liburnija was a ferry owned by Croatian shipping company Jadrolinija, built in 1965 by the NV Scheepswerf & Machinefabriek "De Merwede" Van Vliet & Co, Hardinxveld, Netherlands for Jadrolinija. She entered service from Yugoslavia to Greece and Italy. There were 73 passenger cabins with 182 beds in total, a restaurant for 192 people, the so-called avio-bar for 50 people, a bar for 44 and a lounge for 91 people.

The ship most recently served a coastal line from Rijeka to Dubrovnik as well as some lines between Italy and Croatia. On April 2, 2015, the Liburnija set off on her final voyage from Mali Lošinj to Aliağa, İzmir Province, Turkey for scrapping.

References

External links

Passenger ships
Ferries of Croatia
1965 ships
Ships built in the Netherlands